Aspen Springs is an unincorporated community and census-designated place (CDP) in Mono County, California, United States. The population was 70 at the 2020 census.

Geography
The community lies at the eastern foot of the Sierra Nevada in southwestern Mono County.

Demographics

The 2010 United States Census reported that Aspen Springs had a population of 65. The population density was 18.2 people per square mile (7.0/km). The racial makeup of Aspen Springs was 62 (95.4%) White, 0 (0.0%) African American, 0 (0.0%) Native American, 2 (3.1%) Asian, 0 (0.0%) Pacific Islander, 0 (0.0%) from other races, and 1 (1.5%) from two or more races.  Hispanic or Latino of any race were 1 persons (1.5%).

The Census reported that 65 people (100% of the population) lived in households, 0 (0%) lived in non-institutionalized group quarters, and 0 (0%) were institutionalized.

There were 25 households, out of which 9 (36.0%) had children under the age of 18 living in them, 21 (84.0%) were opposite-sex married couples living together, 1 (4.0%) had a female householder with no husband present, 0 (0%) had a male householder with no wife present.  There were 1 (4.0%) unmarried opposite-sex partnerships, and 1 (4.0%) same-sex married couples or partnerships. 2 households (8.0%) were made up of individuals, and 0 (0%) had someone living alone who was 65 years of age or older. The average household size was 2.60.  There were 22 families (88.0% of all households); the average family size was 2.73.

The population was spread out, with 14 people (21.5%) under the age of 18, 3 people (4.6%) aged 18 to 24, 11 people (16.9%) aged 25 to 44, 30 people (46.2%) aged 45 to 64, and 7 people (10.8%) who were 65 years of age or older.  The median age was 47.8 years. For every 100 females, there were 85.7 males.  For every 100 females age 18 and over, there were 88.9 males.

There were 36 housing units at an average density of 10.1 per square mile (3.9/km), of which 21 (84.0%) were owner-occupied, and 4 (16.0%) were occupied by renters. The homeowner vacancy rate was 0%; the rental vacancy rate was 0%.  56 people (86.2% of the population) lived in owner-occupied housing units and 9 people (13.8%) lived in rental housing units.

References

Census-designated places in Mono County, California
Census-designated places in California